Terror Regime is the eighth studio album by American death metal band Jungle Rot, released through Victory Records on March 19, 2013.

Track listing

Personnel 
David Matrise: Guitar/Lead Vocals
James Genenz: Bass Guitar/Backing Vocals
Geoff Bub: Lead Guitar
Jesse Beahler: Drums
Chris "Wisco" Djuricic: Producer
Gyula Havancsak: Artwork & Design

References

2013 albums
Jungle Rot albums
Victory Records albums